Turner Fork is a stream in Randolph County in the U.S. state of Missouri. It is a tributary of Silver Creek.

Turner Fork has the name of an early citizen.

See also
List of rivers of Missouri

References

Rivers of Randolph County, Missouri
Rivers of Missouri